Yury Kurchashov (born 1930) is a Soviet former swimmer. He competed in the men's 200 metre breaststroke at the 1952 Summer Olympics.

References

External links

1930 births
Possibly living people
Soviet male swimmers
Olympic swimmers of the Soviet Union
Swimmers at the 1952 Summer Olympics
Place of birth missing (living people)
Male breaststroke swimmers